Venezuelan cuisine is influenced by its European (Italian, Spanish, Portuguese, and French), West African, and indigenous traditions. Venezuelan cuisine varies greatly from one region to another. Food staples include corn, rice, plantains, yams, beans and several meats. Potatoes, tomatoes, onions, eggplants, squashes, spinach and zucchini are also common side dishes in the Venezuelan diet. Ají dulce and papelón are found in most recipes. Worcestershire sauce is also used frequently in stews. Venezuela is also known for having a large variety of white cheese (queso blanco), usually named by geographical region.

Main dishes

Typical snacks

Beverages

 Beer
 Chicha  – non-alcoholic drink, made of boiled white rice, milk and sugar.
 Cocada – Coconut milkshake, found mostly in coastal areas.
 Mango juice
 Passion fruit juice
 Malta – Non-alcoholic carbonated malt.
 Papelón con limón 
 Ponche crema – Served especially during Christmas season.
 Venezuelan rum
 Frescolita (strawberry-flavored soda)
 Tequila – Served at celebrations.

Breads
 Casabe – cassava flatbread
 Pan dulce – Spanish for "sweet bread"
 Pan de jamón – usually filled with ham, olives, and raisins and usually eaten during the Christmas season

Desserts

 Alfajor – maize cookie with arequipe and grated coconut
 Bienmesabe
 Brazo gitano (the Spanish Swiss roll)
 Conserva de guayaba - Guava confection
 Pudín de chocolate – chocolate pudding
 Dulce de lechosa Green papaya slowed cooked in a syrup flavored with cinnamon, cloves, and vanilla
 Mousse de chocolate
 Quesillo – local–style caramel flan
 Polvorosas – butter cookies with cinnamon

Cheese 

Queso blanco is very popular in Venezuela. It is produced all over Venezuela with different flavors and textures. The name of each variety of cheese is usually related to the geographical region.
 
 Cuajada andina
 Llanero cheese
 Queso blanco duro
 Queso de año
 Queso de mano
 Queso de Trenza
 Guayanés cheese
 Paisa cheese
 Palmita cheese
 Palmizulia cheese
 Telita cheese

Other foods
 Salpicón

See also

 Latin American cuisine
 South American cuisine

References

External links

 
South American cuisine
Latin American cuisine